Patrick Aloyius "Weeshie" Murphy was born in Bere Island. Moved to Cork for work reasons. He served the GAA for many years, both as a player and an administrator. He played at full-back for Cork county team on the 1945 All-Ireland Senior Football Championship-winning team. He played his club football for St Finbarr's and Lees.

He served as Chairman of Cork County Board from 1955 to 1965, and was Chairman of the Munster Council at the time of his death in 1973. Dr. Con Murphy, team doctor to the Cork inter-county teams, is his son.

Year of birth missing
1973 deaths
Chairmen of county boards of the Gaelic Athletic Association
Cork County Board administrators
Cork inter-county Gaelic footballers
Munster Provincial Council administrators
St Finbarr's Gaelic footballers